Colin Krieger is the leader of the Maverick Party, a political party based in Alberta, Canada. On May 14, 2022, Maverick party members elected him as the new leader of the party. He ran in the 2021 Canadian federal election in Peace River—Westlock, and earned 5.5% of the vote.

He has worked as a truck driver, an oilfield contractor and the owner of an oilfield paramedic service.

Electoral record

References

Year of birth missing (living people)
Living people
Maverick Party politicians
Leaders of political parties in Canada
Western Canadian separatists